Abdashtart I (in Greek, Straton I) was a king of the Phoenician city-state of Sidon who reigned from 365 BC to 352 BC  following the death of his father, Baalshillem II.

Reform

He also expanded the currency, adding bronze coinage as well as silver, which funded the expansion of the Sidonian navy. It is supposed that he gave his name to the city known in the Hellenized world as Straton's Tower, which was later renamed Caesarea by Herod the Great. Joseph Patrich argues, however, that Straton's Tower may have been founded during the Ptolemaic Kingdom instead, in which case the naming may have been for a Ptolemaic general of the third century BC.

Revolt against the Achaemenid Empire
Abdashtart formed diplomatic alliances with Athens and Egypt. Relying on his increased fleet, by 360 BC or 359 BC he felt strong enough to revolt against the Achaemenid Empire. Although the Persians were already fighting the Egyptians (whose Pharaoh Tachos had invaded Phoenicia), and although the rebels won two military victories against the generals of Artaxerxes III in 358 BC and 356 BC, the revolt was suppressed in 355 BC and led to Persian occupation for the next four years, during which time the Sidonian currency was banned, minting privileges were stopped, and the Persian currency was forcibly introduced. The revolt has been described as 'a grave political error' for Abdashtart; not only did the Sidonians experience financial crisis and military repression, but they also lost swathes of territory to their neighbour, Tyre.

Later life

The Persians left Abdashtart on the throne, and he proceeded to further diplomatic ties with Athens and Salamis, Cyprus, which had probably supported his revolt against Artaxerxes. Historians do not know whether he was the last of his dynasty, as it remains uncertain whether his known heir and successor, Tennes, was his son or some other close relative.

Abdashtart was honoured by an inscription in the Acropolis of Athens (IG II2 141):

References

Bibliography 

 

4th-century BC rulers in Asia
Kings of Sidon
Rebellions against the Achaemenid Empire
Rulers in the Achaemenid Empire
4th-century BC Phoenician people